Burstall is a village and civil parish in Suffolk, England. The parish includes the hamlet of Burstallhill. Recorded in the Domesday Book as Burgestala / Burghestala. It is in the Belstead Brook electoral division of Suffolk County Council.

The south-western boundary of the parish is delineated by Belstead Brook, a tributary of the River Orwell. The A1071 between Ipswich and Hadleigh crosses Belstead Brook at Burstall Bridge.

Burstall Hall is ⅔ mile (1 km) northeast from the village.

Mill Farm is to the west and Hill Farm to the east.

The village hall built in 1910 in memory of John Cranfield. It is a Mock Tudor building with a recent lottery grant improvements. No alcohol is sold in the hall.

The Half Moon public house closed in 1968 and the Post office closed in 2006.

St Mary's Church
The parish church of St Mary has been a Grade I listed building since 22 February 1955.  It is largely early fourteenth-century and fifteenth-century and was restored in 1866 and again, between 1870 and 1873, by Frederick Barnes of Ipswich.

References

External links

Babergh District
Civil parishes in Suffolk
Villages in Suffolk